Distagmos is a genus of moths of the family Plutellidae.

Species
Distagmos ledereri - Herrich-Schäffer 1854

Plutellidae